Healing Hearts is a 2000 Hong Kong medical romantic drama film directed by Gary Tang and stars Tony Leung Chiu-wai, Michelle Reis, and Kenny Bee.

Cast 

 Tony Leung Chiu-wai as Lawrence
 Michelle Reis as Jackie — Paul's recently comatose girlfriend
 Kenny Bee as Doctor Paul
 Pinky Cheung as Nurse Karen

 Esther Kwan as Samantha
 Stephen Fung as Alan

Production 
The film was shot concurrently alongside a television pilot for a television series on Asia Television also entitled Healing Hearts. This is not to be confused with the medical drama television series Healing Hands (1998), which director Gary Tang also wrote.

Reception 
Paul Fonoroff for the South China Morning Post wrote, "Leung proves that he is an alchemist, for he delivers a first-rate performance that, although failing to transform the dreck into gelt, provides Healing Hearts with its most watchable moments."

Soundtrack 
The film features Patti Austin's "Say That You Love Me".

References 

Hong Kong romantic drama films
2000 films
2000s Cantonese-language films
2000 romantic drama films